The American Go Association (AGA) was founded in 1935, to promote the board game of Go in the United States. 
Founded by chess master Edward Lasker and some friends at Chumley's restaurant in New York City, the AGA is one of the oldest Western Go associations.

The AGA publishes a weekly online newsletter that reaches more than 13,000 subscribers worldwide, The American Go E-Journal, and an annual Yearbook; maintains a national rating system; organizes an annual national event, The US Go Congress; selects North American representatives in international tournaments; and provides support to its members and chapters as they promote Go in their communities.

Events for youth have also been established, including tournaments and an annual AGA youth summer camp that features instruction from professional players. The AGA has developed a set of rules that attempts to reconcile difference between "area"-based rule sets and "territory"-based rule sets, and participates actively in an international committee, trying to establish a unified worldwide set of rules.

As a member of the International Go Federation, which in turn belongs to SportAccord, the AGA is the official organization responsible for managing and promoting Go in the United States.

Publicity and exposure
President Barack Obama's administration contacted the AGA for an American-made Go board etched with the presidential seal and signature, the gift given on November 17, 2009 to China's President Hu Jintao.

Whilst the US go community were buzzing about getting exposure, and the BBC covered the event on its Newsnight programme, the US press did not really pick up the story, except the Chapel Hill Herald, the local paper where the board was made.

The association and its aim of finding the first professional American Go player were heavily featured in the 2018 movie The Surrounding Game.

Professional system
In December 2011, The AGA partnered with the Korea Baduk Association and the Korean go server Tygem to promote a new professional players system for the US. Tygem agreed to sponsor and be the broadcaster for the 2012 professional certification tournament. In addition, several Asian professional tournaments have invited AGA professionals to compete.

In 2021, the AGA transferred its professional system to a new governing organization, the North American Go Federation, formed by the AGA and the Canadian Go Association. The certification system is open to both US citizens and Canadian citizens via invitation pending the residency requirement and qualifying as a finalist.

Professional players
Professional status in Go is customarily for life. The dates below indicate when the players were granted professional status.

2012: Andy Liu 1p and Gansheng Shi 1p
2014: Calvin Sun 2p
2015: Ryan Li 3p
2016: Eric Lui 1p
2022 Kevin Yang 1p and Alexander Qi 1p

AGA City League

The City League is an AGA tournament where teams from different cities play each other in a league system, on the Pandanet server in the AGA room.

The teams consist of up to five players, out of whom three are selected to play in each round.

The current rules are listed on Pandanet.

See also 

 International Go Federation
 List of professional Go tournaments
 Nihon Ki-in (Japanese Go Association)
 Hanguk Kiwon (Korean Go Association)
 Zhongguo Qiyuan (Chinese Go Association)
 Taiwan Chi-Yuan (Taiwanese Go Association)
 European Go Federation

References

External links
 Official site
 The American Go E-Journal
 AGA Yearbook
 AGA ratings
 US Go Congress
 US Go Summer Camps for Kids

Go
Go organizations